Robert Dewees "Cutty" Cutshall (December 29, 1911 – August 16, 1968) was an American jazz trombonist.

Cutshall was born in Huntington Co., Pennsylvania, on December 29, 1911. He played in Pittsburgh early in his career, making his first major tour in 1934 with Charley Dornberger. He joined Jan Savitt's orchestra in 1938, then played with Benny Goodman in the early 1940s. Later in the decade he worked frequently with Billy Butterfield and did some freelance work in New York City. He started working with Eddie Condon in 1949, an association which lasted over a decade. Cutshall was touring with Condon in Toronto when the trombonist died of a heart attack in his hotel room on August 16, 1968.

Cutshall's credits include work with Peanuts Hucko, Bob Crosby, Ella Fitzgerald, and Louis Armstrong.

Discography
With Eddie Condon
That Toddlin' Town (Warner Bros., 1959)
With Bobby Hackett
Creole Cookin' (Verve, 1967)

References

External links
 Cutty Cutshall recordings at the Discography of American Historical Recordings.

1911 births
1968 deaths
American jazz trombonists
Male trombonists
20th-century American musicians
20th-century trombonists
20th-century American male musicians
American male jazz musicians
World's Greatest Jazz Band members